Quinn Do (born October 9, 1975 in Vietnam) is an American professional poker player, a restaurant owner, and a World Series of Poker bracelet winner with multiple live tournament results adding up to over $2.5 million in career earnings.

Early life and career
Do was born in Vietnam and raised in Seattle, Washington after his family moved to the United States when he was 11 years old, Quinn majored in criminology at the University of Washington but he decided to quit college and went on to own two Vietnamese restaurant one located in Seattle and the other in the Metropolitan area of Los Angeles.

World Series of Poker 
Do has 15 money finishes at the World Series of Poker (WSOP), including three final tables.  On June 16 at the 2005 World Series of Poker he finished 5th in the $1,500 Limit Hold'em Shootout event, earning $34,465.  Two days later, he won his first WSOP bracelet, earning an additional $265,975 in the $2,500 Limit Hold'em event.

World Series of Poker bracelets

World Poker Tour 
Do has three World Poker Tour (WPT) cashes, including a final table where he finished runner-up to Phil Ivey at the WPT 2008 L.A. Poker Classic in Los Angeles, California, earning $909,400.

Other poker events 
Prior to becoming a WPT event in 2007, Do finished runner-up to Amnon Filippi at the first Bellagio Challenge Cup, earning $228,850, the final table including such notable names such as Jeff Shulman, Mimi Tran, Sam Grizzle, Scotty Nguyen, and Spider-Man famed actor Tobey Maguire, who finished in 8th place.

Do won the $3,000 No Limit Hold'em event at the Fourth Annual Five Diamond World Poker Classic in 2005 and finished 4th in the $1,500 No Limit Hold'em event at the Festa Al Lago V in 2006.

As of 2015, his total live tournament winnings exceed $2,500,000.

References

External links
 World Poker Tour profile
 CardPlayer profile

1975 births
World Series of Poker bracelet winners
American poker players
Vietnamese emigrants to the United States
People from Seattle
Living people